Tadayoshi (written: , , , , ,  or ) is a masculine Japanese given name. Notable people with the name include:

, Japanese samurai
, Japanese equestrian
, Japanese kugyō
, Japanese politician
, Japanese politician
, Japanese daimyō
, Japanese daimyō
, Japanese daimyō
, Japanese idol, singer and actor
, Japanese general
, Japanese samurai and daimyō
, Japanese daimyō
, Japanese daimyō
, Japanese samurai
, Japanese volleyball player

Japanese masculine given names